An escape set (in German Tauchretter = "diving rescuer") is a breathing set that allows its wearer to survive for a time in an environment without (sufficiently) breathable air.

Early escape sets were rebreathers and were typically used to escape from submarines with a depleted air supply that, for technical or military reasons, were unable to surface. One example is the Davis Submerged Escape Apparatus. Escape sets were also used ashore, e.g. in the mining industry, and for escape from tanks (Amphibious Tank Escape Apparatus).

The small open-circuit scuba Helicopter Aircrew Breathing Device has the similar purpose of providing breathing gas to escape from a ditched helicopter.

Naming
Currently, language in German as in English, tauchen = "diving" only means in water. Until the middle of the 20th century the German word tauchen = "to dive" also meant "to stay in unbreathable atmosphere". Thus around 1900 a water-cooled fire protection hood with air supply for firefighters was called in German a Feuertaucher (= "fire diver"), and still into the 1940s in German a man with a breathing apparatus for use in unbreathable atmosphere was called a Gastaucher (= "gas diver"). But as escape sets were used more for rescue from sunken submarines and as light diving equipment, the German word "tauchen" was restricted to underwater meanings.

Function

Chemical
Atmospheric air contains about 21% oxygen. In normal breathing the body uses about 4% and replaces it with carbon dioxide. A volume of air can be breathed several times before its oxygen content is exhausted, but carbon dioxide accumulates as the oxygen is used up, and causes discomfort and respiratory distress, so it must be removed from the breathing cycle.

For the general function of this sort of breathing set, see rebreather.

The absorbent used is almost always sodalime, or a material based on sodalime, but in former times slaked lime or quicklime or caustic soda was sometimes used.

Submarine escape sets had a mouthpiece, so the user had to also wear a noseclip to avoid breathing water through his nose. The working time of an escape set depended upon depth of submersion, between 15 and 45 minutes.

Use during submarine escape
If an emergency made exit from a submarine necessary, first the crew had to wait until the air inside the submarine was compressed by pressure of entering sea water until the remaining air pocket was at the same pressure as outside. The lower end of the escape hatch had therefore to be low enough so that the remaining air inside the submarine could not escape when the hatch was opened. Then the crew could step out. The set's user had to breathe continually to avoid pulmonary barotrauma. Escape sets are used in these films:
Das Boot (Johann das Gespenst stops water from breaking in under a diesel engine).
 (controlled exit from a sunk submarine).
In Enemy Hands (To survive a prolonged submersion while under attack by a destroyer).

History
Development of the first militarily useful submarines before the First World War raised briefly the question about rescue possibilities if the submarine sank. First, often deadly attempts were started with simple "breathing bags", which were useful as a very short-period assistance, but often did not contain enough oxygen to survive the whole ascent. Robert Henry Davis and Henry A. Fleuss developed a rebreather, which was useful in the mining industry and under water.
1903: Siebe Gorman started to make this breathing set in England; in the years afterwards it was improved, and later was called the Davis Submerged Escape Apparatus.
1905: An important innovation: metering valves to control the supply of oxygen. This was promptly adopted by other companies which made escape sets.
1907: Draeger of Lübeck invented the U-Boot-Retter = "submarine rescuer".
Both systems were based on oxygen supply from a high-pressure cylinder with simultaneous absorption of carbon dioxide by an inserted cartridge filled with sodium hydroxide.
1916: The Draeger model DM 2 became standard equipment of the German Navy.
1926: Draeger displayed a rescue breathing apparatus that the wearer could swim with. While the previous devices served only for ascending to the surface and were designed also to develop buoyancy so that the wearer arrived at the surface without swimming movements, the diving set had weights, which also made it possible to dive down with it, to search and rescue after an accident.
1939: Hans Hass developed from the escape set a type of rebreather with its bag on his back and two breathing tubes but no backpack box. These sets appear much in his movies and books.

Further developments of the escape gear
Later developments included a more suitable breathing mixture, automatically proportioned by a valve, instead of just a single oxygen or compressed air cylinder, which made possible the use at greater depth of these breathing sets.

Oxygen rebreathers are technically simpler than mixture breathing sets, but limit use to shallow water. Oxygen rebreathers are used by combat divers and some underwater photographers, as they make far fewer bubbles than open-circuit scuba, and those bubbles could betray the diver or affect the behaviour of sea life.

Another operational area is in fire protection, for instance in the chemical industry or for rescue in the mining industry, where the need for a long duration makes the use of compressed air sets impractical. Advancements in rebreather design include complex gas proportioning and control devices, allowing deeper and longer use by professional and technical divers. Today's escape sets are combined with lifejackets and protection hoods to protect the head and airway from being overwhelmed by water. They are used with thermal exposure suits similar to scuba diving drysuits. Use is nevertheless limited to comparatively shallow depths; escape capsules, rescue submarines and emergency lift devices with dropable ballast can provide the possibility of escape in deeper water.

See also

Literature
Hermann Stelzner, Tauchertechnik - Handbuch für Taucher / Lehrbuch für Taucheranwärter. Verlag Charles Coleman, Lübeck 1943

Submarine rescue equipment
Rebreathers